Iyuno, Inc. is a major provider of subtitling, translation, and language dubbing services to the entertainment industry. The headquarters are located in the Westchester district of Los Angeles, California with other offices and facilities located in 37 countries around the world.

History
In 1990, the Swedish media company Modern Times Group acquired the majority shareholding in Svensk Text (SDI Media). The then 
'SDI Media' was sold by MTG to Warburg Pincus for US$60 million in 2004. In 2007 it was acquired by Elevation Partners, a private equity firm, mainly investing in media and entertainment companies. In 2008, SDI Media Group acquired Visiontext, a competitor in the subtitling industry, from Ascent Media.

On February 21, 2015, Japanese media parent company Imagica Robot Holdings partnered with Sumitomo Corporation and the Cool Japan Fund to acquire SDI Media.

On January 22, 2021, the localization media company Iyuno Media Group announced they had reached a deal with Imagica Group to acquired 100% of SDI Media.

On April 1, 2021, SDI Media was acquired by Iyuno Media Group, forming the new company, Iyuno-SDI Group. On October 26, 2022, the company was renamed "Iyuno."

Branches
SDI Media Norway AS is one of SDI Media Group's Nordic branches. It is located in Oslo, the capital of Norway. The company is commissioned to dub material for film distributors and TV channels. The company used to be known as Sun Studio Norge.

Production list

Anime 

 Ajin: Demi-Human (Polygon Pictures/Netflix)
 Battle Game in 5 Seconds (Crunchyroll)
 Beastars (Orange/Netflix)
 BNA: Brand New Animal (Studio Trigger/Netflix)
 Children of the Whales (J.C.Staff/Netflix)
 Dorohedoro (MAPPA/Netflix)
 Drifting Dragons (Polygon Pictures/Netflix)
 Forest of Piano (Gaina/Netflix)
 Godzilla Singular Point (Orange/Bones/Netflix)
 Hi Score Girl (J.C.Staff/Netflix)
 ID-0 (Sanzigen/Netflix)
 Inazuma Eleven: Ares (OLM)
 Kengan Ashura (Larx Entertainment/Netflix)
 Knights of Sidonia (Polygon Pictures/Netflix -> Funimation)
 Kuromukuro (P.A. Works/Netflix)
 Pokémon Origins (Production I.G/Xebec/OLM)
 Record of Ragnarok (Graphinica/Netflix)
 Revisions (Shirogumi/Netflix)
 Ultramarine Magmell (Pierrot+/Netflix)
 Violet Evergarden (Kyoto Animation/Netflix)

Animation 

 Beyblade Burst (seasons 1-2 only; OLM)
 Yo-kai Watch (season 2 only; OLM)

 Suklisbob Kvadratbiksis

ONA 

 Devilman Crybaby (Science SARU/Netflix)
 High-Rise Invasion (Zero-G/Netflix)
 Lost Song (Liden Films/DWANGO/Netflix)

Films 

 Blame! (Polygon Pictures/Netflix)
 Child of Kamiari Month (Liden Films/Netflix)
 Gantz: O (Digital Frontier)
 In This Corner of the World (MAPPA)
 Kabaneri of the Iron Fortress: The Battle of Unato (Wit Studio)
 Penguin Highway (Studio Colorido)
 Pokémon the Movie: Secrets of the Jungle (OLM/Netflix)
 The Seven Deadly Sins the Movie: Prisoners of the Sky (A-1 Pictures)
 Tales from Earthsea (Studio Ghibli)
 Violet Evergarden: Eternity and the Auto Memory Doll (Kyoto Animation)
 A Whisker Away (Studio Colorido/Netflix)

See also 

 Playism
 vidby
 Deepl

References

External links 
 Official website
 Company Overview
 

1965 establishments in California
2015 mergers and acquisitions
2021 mergers and acquisitions
American companies established in 1965
American subsidiaries of foreign companies
Companies based in Los Angeles
Dubbing studios
Elevation Partners
Entertainment companies based in California
Film production companies of the United States
Imagica Robot Holdings
Mass media companies established in 1965
Multinational companies headquartered in the United States